William Daniel Murray (November 20, 1908 – October 3, 1994) was a United States district judge of the United States District Court for the District of Montana.

Education and career

Born in Butte, Montana, Murray attended Columbia University, and received a Bachelor of Science degree from Georgetown University in 1932, and a Bachelor of Laws from the Alexander Blewett III School of Law at the University of Montana in 1936. He was a United States Naval Reserve Lieutenant during World War II from 1942 to 1945, and was otherwise in private practice in Butte between 1936 and 1949, and an Assistant United States Attorney of the District of Montana from 1938 to 1942.

Federal judicial service

On April 5, 1949, Murray was nominated by President Harry S. Truman to a seat on the United States District Court for the District of Montana vacated by Judge Robert Lewis Brown Sr. Murray was confirmed by the United States Senate on May 4, 1949, and received his commission on May 9, 1949. He served as Chief Judge from 1957 to 1965, assuming senior status due to a certified disability on December 31, 1965. Murray served in that capacity until his death on October 3, 1994, in Butte.

Family

Murray was the son of United States Senator James E. Murray.

References

Sources
 

1908 births
1994 deaths
People from Butte, Montana
Columbia University alumni
Georgetown University alumni
University of Montana alumni
Judges of the United States District Court for the District of Montana
United States district court judges appointed by Harry S. Truman
20th-century American judges
United States Navy officers
Assistant United States Attorneys